Umberto Malvano (17 July 1884 – 15 September 1971) was an early Italian football player from Turin. He was one of the thirteen men who founded Juventus in 1897. After several years of playing as a striker for Juventus, he moved to rivals A.C. Milan and won the 1906 Italian Football Championship with the latter club.

Honours
Milan
Italian Football Championship: 1906

Individual
Capocannoniere: 1901

References

External links

Italian footballers
Juventus F.C. players
A.C. Milan players
1884 births
Year of death missing
Association football forwards